Lamine Bá (born 4 April 1994) is a Bissau-Guinean professional footballer who plays as a centre-back for Portuguese Liga 3 club Moncarapachense. He was capped once for the Guinea-Bissau national team.

Club career
On 4 August 2013, Bá made his professional debut with Chaves in a 2013–14 Taça da Liga match against Moreirense.

International
Bá made his debut for the Guinea-Bissau national team on 23 March 2019 in an Africa Cup of Nations qualifier against Mozambique, as a starter.

References

External links

Stats and profile at LPFP 

1994 births
Living people
Bissau-Guinean footballers
Guinea-Bissau international footballers
Association football defenders
Étoile Lusitana players
G.D. Chaves players
Juventude de Pedras Salgadas players
SC Mirandela players
AD Oliveirense players
S.C. Ideal players
Oriental Dragon FC players
Liga Portugal 2 players
Bissau-Guinean expatriate footballers
Expatriate footballers in Senegal
Expatriate footballers in Portugal
Bissau-Guinean expatriate sportspeople in Senegal
Bissau-Guinean expatriate sportspeople in Portugal